Rotating ellipsoidal variables are a class of variable star.  They are close binary systems whose components are ellipsoidal.  They are not eclipsing, but fluctuations in apparent magnitude occur due to changes in the amount of light emitting area visible to the observer.  Typical brightness fluctuations do not exceed 0.1 magnitudes.

The brightest rotating ellipsoidal variable is Spica (α Virginis).

References